Central Park is a station on the Chicago Transit Authority's 'L' system, serving the Pink Line and the North Lawndale neighborhood. The station opened on December 9, 1951, as a replacement for the closed Drake, Lawndale, and Homan stations.

Bus connections
CTA
  82 Kimball/Homan 
  157 Streeterville/Taylor

Notes and references

Notes

References

External links
Central Park Station page
Central Park Avenue entrance from Google Maps Street View

CTA Pink Line stations
Railway stations in the United States opened in 1951
North Lawndale, Chicago